The following is the list of squads that took part in the men's water polo tournament at the 1976 Summer Olympics.

Australia
The following players represented Australia:

 Paul Williams
 David Neesham
 Ian Mills
 Peter Montgomery
 Eddie Brooks
 Andrew Kerr
 Ross Langdon
 Charles Turner
 David Woods
 Randall Goff
 Rodney Woods

Canada
The following players represented Canada:

 Guy Leclerc
 Gabor Csepregi
 David Hart
 Paul Pottier
 Gaétan Turcotte
 Clifford Barry
 Jim Ducharme
 Rick Pugliese
 George Gross
 John MacLeod
 Dominique Dion

Cuba
The following players represented Cuba:

 Oscar Periche
 Osvaldo García
 Ramon Peña
 Lazaro Costa
 David Rodríguez
 Nelson Domínguez
 Jorge Rizo
 Eugenio Almenteros
 Jesús Pérez
 Gerardo Rodríguez
 Oriel Domínguez

Hungary
The following players represented Hungary:

 Endre Molnár
 István Szivós Jr.
 Tamás Faragó
 László Sárosi
 Ferenc Konrád
 Tibor Cservenyák
 György Horkai
 Gábor Csapó
 Attila Sudár
 György Kenéz
 György Gerendás

Iran
The following players represented Iran:

 Firouz Abdul Mohammadian
 Jahangir Tavakoli
 Haydar Shonjani
 Ahmed Paidayesh
 Dariush Movahedi
 Bahram Tavakoli
 Reza Kamrani
 Manouchehr Parchami-Araghi
 Hossein Nassim
 Abdul Reza Majdpour
 Ahmed Yaghoti

Italy
The following players represented Italy:

 Alberto Alberani Samaritani
 Roldano Simeoni
 Silvio Baracchini
 Sante Marsili
 Marcello Del Duca
 Gianni De Magistris
 Alessandro Ghibellini
 Luigi Castagnola
 Riccardo De Magistris
 Vincenzo D'Angelo
 Umberto Panerai

Mexico
The following players represented Mexico:

 Daniel Gómez
 Francisco García
 Javier Guerra
 Maximiliano Aguilar
 Arturo Valencia
 Juan Manuel García
 Armando Fernández
 Víctorino Beristain
 Jorge Coste
 Juan Yañez
 Alfred Schmidt

Netherlands
The following players represented the Netherlands:

 Evert Kroon
 Nico Landeweerd
 Jan Evert Veer
 Hans van Zeeland
 Ton Buunk
 Piet de Zwarte
 Hans Smits
 Rik Toonen
 Gijze Stroboer
 Andy Hoepelman

Romania
The following players represented Romania:

 Florin Slăvei
 Cornel Rusu
 Gheorghe Zamfirescu
 Adrian Nastasiu
 Dinu Popescu
 Claudiu Rusu
 Ilie Slăvei
 Liviu Răducanu
 Viorel Rus
 Adrian Schervan
 Doru Spînu

Soviet Union
The following players represented the Soviet Union:

 Anatoly Klebanov
 Sergey Kotenko
 Aleksandr Dreval
 Aleksandr Dolgushin
 Vitaly Romanchuk
 Aleksandr Kabanov
 Oleksiy Barkalov
 Nikolay Melnikov
 Nuzgari Mshvenieradze
 Vladimir Iselidze
 Aleksandr Zakharov

Yugoslavia
The following players represented Yugoslavia:

 Miloš Marković
 Ozren Bonačić
 Uroš Marović
 Predrag Manojlović
 Đuro Savinović
 Damir Polić
 Siniša Belamarić
 Dušan Antunović
 Dejan Dabović
 Boško Lozica
 Zoran Kačić

West Germany
The following players represented West Germany:

 Günter Kilian
 Ludger Weeke
 Hans Simon
 Jürgen Stiefel
 Roland Freund
 Wolfgang Mechler
 Martin Jellinghaus
 Werner Obschernikat
 Horst Kilian
 Peter Röhle
 Günter Wolf

References

1976